Tapp is a surname. Notable people with the surname include:

Alex Tapp (born 1982), English footballer
Alistair Tapp (born 1964), English cricketer
Darryl Tapp (born 1984), American football player
Gordie Tapp, Canadian singer
Hannah Tapp (born 1995), American volleyball player
Ian Tapp, English sound engineer
Jake Tapp (born 1988), Canadian swimmer
Jimmy Tapp (1918–2004), Canadian radio personality
John Tapp (commentator) (born 1941), Australian racecaller
Margaret and Seana Tapp, Australian murder victims
Nigel Tapp (1904–1991), British Army general
Paige (Tapp) Sander (born 1995), American volleyball player

Fictional characters:
David Tapp, character from the Saw franchise

External links
Tapp Surname, Family Crest & Coat of Arms
Tapp Family History